Saltia is a monotypic genus of flowering plants belonging to the family Amaranthaceae. It just contains one species, Saltia papposa. It is in the Amaranthoideae subfamily.

It is native to Saudi Arabia and Yemen, in the Arabian Peninsula. It is found on gravel plains with other shrubs.

The genus name of Saltia is in honour of Henry Salt (1780–1827), an English artist, traveller, collector of antiquities, diplomat, and Egyptologist. The Latin specific epithet of papposa refers to pappus the wind-dispersal mechanism for the seeds.
It was first described and published in Prodr. Vol.13 (Series 2) on page 325 in 1849.

References

Amaranthaceae
Plants described in 1849
Flora of Saudi Arabia
Flora of Yemen